This is a summary of the electoral history of David Shearer, Leader of the New Zealand Labour Party (2011–13) and Member of Parliament for  (2009–2016).

Parliamentary elections

2002 election

2009 by-election

2011 election

2014 election

References

Shearer, David